Rudolf Jehle (20 February 1894 – 18 December 1970) was a Liechtenstein sports shooter. He competed in the 50 m rifle event at the 1936 Summer Olympics.

References

1894 births
1970 deaths
Liechtenstein male sport shooters
Olympic shooters of Liechtenstein
Shooters at the 1936 Summer Olympics
Place of birth missing